Alex Krewanty is a Papua New Guinean rugby league footballer who represented Papua New Guinea in the 2000 World Cup.

He is the younger brother of former International, Arnold Krewanty.

Apart from Rugby League, Krewanty also played in the Hong Kong Sevens for PNG Pukpuks in the 2002 Hong Kong Sevens.

Playing career
Krewanty played five test matches for Papua New Guinea in 2000, including all four matches at the 2000 World Cup.

Krewanty played in the NSW Metropolitant Cup Competition and also had a stint with First Division Bankstown Cantabury Bulldogs

Krewanty also played in the Super League Nines in Fiji for the PNG Kumuls

Krewanty played for the Port Moresby Vipers in the SP Cup and also in the Queensland Bundy Cup Competition

Alex and his brother Julius also played for the South Tweed Koalas in the Gold Coast Group 18 Competition

.

Krewanty was juggling his Teaching and Rugby League Career all at once.

References

Living people
Papua New Guinean rugby league players
Papua New Guinea national rugby league team players
Port Moresby Vipers players
1974 births
Rugby league fullbacks
Rugby league centres
Rugby league wingers
Papua New Guinean educators